The Indianapolis Giants is a United States Australian Football League team, based in Indianapolis, United States. It was founded in 2013. They play in the USAFL.

See also

References

External links

Australian rules football clubs in the United States
Sports teams in Indianapolis
American football teams established in 2013
2013 establishments in Indiana
Greater Western Sydney Giants